Rhiginia is a New World genus in the subfamily Ectrichodiinae of Reduviidae (assassin bugs). Species of this genus are generally active, alert and strong fliers.

Partial list of species

Rhiginia cinctiventris (Stål, 1872) 	 
Rhiginia cruciata (Say, 1832) 	 
Rhiginia lateralis (Lepeletier and Serville, 1825)

References

Reduviidae